Cleveland Leigh Abbott Memorial Alumni Stadium, originally known as the Alumni Bowl, is a stadium in Tuskegee, Alabama.  It is primarily used for American football, and is the home field of the Tuskegee University Golden Tigers. The stadium holds 10,000 spectators and opened in 1925.  It is named after former Tuskegee Tigers head football coach, Cleveland L. Abbott.  When it opened, it was the first stadium opened on a historically black school's campus.

References

External links
Stadium information

1925 establishments in Alabama
American football venues in Alabama
College football venues
Sports venues completed in 1925
Tuskegee Golden Tigers football